Carabus montivagus is a species of black coloured beetle from family Carabidae, found in Albania, Bulgaria, Greece, Hungary, Italy, Romania, Slovakia, and all of the republics of the former Yugoslavia.

There is a subspecies: Carabus montivagus montivagus.

References

montivagus
Beetles of Europe
Beetles described in 1825